Valenciennea puellaris, the Orange-spotted sleeper-goby, Orange-dashed goby, or Maiden goby, Diamond Watchman goby, is a species of goby native to the Indian Ocean and the western Pacific Ocean.  It inhabits lagoons and outer reefs where it occurs on sandy substrates with larger pieces of rubble to burrow under.  It can reach a length of  SL.  It is a prevalent fish in the aquarium hobby. Its main diet is composed of zoo plankton and dead fish or insects.

References

External links
 

Valenciennea
Fish described in 1956